Josie Cotton (born 1956) is an American singer and songwriter, best known for "Johnny Are You Queer?" and "He Could Be the One" from 1982. "Johnny Are You Queer?" was used on the soundtracks to Jackass Number Two and Valley Girl. "He Could Be the One" was also used in Valley Girl.

Career
Born Josie Jones in Dallas, Texas, Cotton sang with Dallas bands and then moved to Los Angeles, California. She met Larson Paine in Hollywood, and the two began dating. Larson and his brother Bobby gave her "Johnny, Are You Queer?", previously performed live by The Go-Go's, to record as a demo. After the first label to sign her folded, Bomp! Records released the song as a single.

The performance of the single attracted the attention of Elektra Records, which re-released the single and a full album, with the future Kingdom Come member Johnny B Frank on keyboards, in 1982. The Convertible Music LP has music reminiscent of the 1960s girl group tradition. Cotton made an appearance in the 1983 film Valley Girl, singing "Johnny, Are You Queer?", "He Could Be the One" and "School Is In" during the film's prom scene. In 1984, Elektra issued Cotton's follow-up album, From the Hip, which returned a minor hit with the cover of Looking Glass' "Jimmy Loves Maryann" (with guitar by Lindsey Buckingham). In 1986, Cotton appeared in a minor role as the character Silver Ring in the John McTiernan horror film Nomads opposite Adam Ant and Pierce Brosnan. "Johnny Are You Queer?" was later used in Jackass Number Two during the "Anaconda Ballpit" stunt. The punk band Screeching Weasel covered the song on their 1994 album How to Make Enemies and Irritate People.

In 1993, Cotton recorded Frightened by Nightingales (as Josey Cotton), a collection of songs by the songwriter/violinist/self promoter Bill Rhea. Continuing to work behind the scenes, Cotton co-founded B-Girl Records, which issued recordings by Goldenboy and Alaska!. An album of her own music, The Influence of Fear on Salesmen, was planned for release in 2002 on B-Girl but failed to materialize under that title. Cotton released Movie Disaster Music in 2006, followed by Invasion of the B-Girls, a collection of B-movie theme song covers, also produced in part by Bill Rhea, in 2007. Building on the critical success for these recordings, Cotton released Pussycat Babylon in late 2010. As of May 2018, "Johnny Are You Queer" ranks at No. 80 on VH1's list of the Top 100 Greatest One Hit Wonders of the 80s.

Wikipedia once listed her birth name as Kathleen Josey, so she was asked where Cotton came from. But in a 2009 interview with Magnet Magazine, she set the record straight: "I was actually born Josie Jones. My mother kept marrying and taking her maiden name back - she was married six times. Cotton is actually a family name from way back."

Discography

Studio albums
Convertible Music – 1982, Elektra Records (No. 147, US)
From the Hip – 1984, Elektra
Frightened by Nightingales – 1993, Silences (France) (1996 U.S. release on Roxco Records)
Movie Disaster Music – 2006, Scruffy
Invasion of the B-Girls – 2007, Scruffy
Pussycat Babylon – 2010, Scruffy
Everything Is Oh Yeah – 2019 Kitten Robot/Cleopatra Records (recorded in 1986)

Compilations
Convertible Music/From the Hip (double album CD reissue) – 2002, Collectables Records

Singles
 "Johnny Are You Queer?", (Bomp!) (1981)
 "Johnny Are You Queer?", (Elektra reissue) (1982) No. 38 Billboard Club Play Singles
 "Johnny Are You Queer?", (Quality Q-2403-M)) (1982) Peaked at No. 9 in Canada on RPM 50 Singles (March 20, 1982)
 "He Could Be the One", (1982) No. 34 Billboard Mainstream Rock, No. 74 Billboard Pop Singles
 "Jimmy Loves Mary-Anne", (1984) No. 82 Billboard Pop Singles
 "Johnny Are You Queer?", A Date with John Waters (2007)
 "See the New Hong Kong", (2011) Remixes No. 12 Billboard Dance/Club Play 2011
 "Ukrainian Cowboy" (2019) Kitten Robot/Sympathy for the Record Industry (2019)

Filmography
 Valley Girl (1983)
 Nomads (1986)
Top Wing (2018)

References

External links

Living people
American women singers
Women new wave singers
Musicians from Dallas
1956 births
Date of birth missing (living people)
Cleopatra Records artists
21st-century American women